The Posavje District (literally, 'Sava Valley District'), or simply Posavje, is a district of the City Municipality of Ljubljana, the capital of Slovenia.

Geography
The Posavje District is bounded on the west by a line through farmland east of the A2 Freeway, on the north by the Sava River, on the east by Stryia Street (Štajerska cesta), and on the south by the H3 Expressway (i.e., the northern section of the Ljubljana Loop). The district includes the former settlements of Ježica, Kleče, Mala Vas na Posavju, Savlje, and Stožice.

External links
Posavje District on Geopedia

 
Districts of Ljubljana